"Anuel AA: Bzrp Music Sessions, Vol. 46" is a song by Argentine record producer Bizarrap and Puerto Rican rapper and singer Anuel AA. It was released on November 3, 2021. This is the third Bzrp Music Sessions to feature an artist of Puerto Rican descent. Bizarrap collaborated previously with Eladio Carrion and Nicky Jam and Anuel AA is the second Puerto Rican artist to record with Bizarrap.

Background  
The session has been the subject of rumors since mid-July 2021. In August Anuel's manager Frabian Eli announced in an interview that Anuel and Biza are interested to work together. 

At the beginning of October, Anuel uploaded photos on his Instagram in a studio, and then Bizarrap confirmed that he was in the same place, producing. On October 31, 2021 Bizarrap implicitly confirmed the exit of this session, as it does in the usual way: leaving subtle clues. First, he uploaded a deleted photo where there was a cap with the United States flag and next to it a double A battery pack, referring to the name of the Puerto Rican artist. Next, Bizarrap uploaded the most obvious clue: a photo with an Anuel merch hoodie that says “Real Hasta La Muerte”. 

The official confirmation was made the next day, November 1, 2021, through an Instagram post Bizarrap. Anuel also made the same post.

Composition and lyric 
In the mid-october Anuel posted an acapella singing about the thug life on the street and being in the hood. A day before the release of the music session he posted a video with Bizarrap, writing: "Do you remember the chore that I posted singing (Asi es el caserio, asi es mi caserio)?".

After the release of the song he had some criticism about the lyrics of the song. Many people began to criticize Anuel AA for the lyrics of the song after there was a verse in the lyrics which says "Some of us are not dead, but we are not alive (Algunos no estamos muertos, pero no estamos vivos)", since many said that it was a meaningless phrase as well as the verse "She told me that she is a lesbian, then we do a threesome (Me dijo que ella es lesbiana, pues entonces hacemos un trío)".

Music video
The music video for the song was directed by Pipes and reached 1 million views on YouTube in just 30 minutes of release. The music video for the song reached 10 million views on YouTube in one day.

Personnel
Cerdits adapted from Genius.

 Bizarrap – producer, recording engineer
 Anuel AA – vocals
 Evlay – mixing
 Javier Fracchia – mastering
 EQ El Equalizer – recording engineer
 Nicolás Patiño – assistant engineer
 ElTiin14 – artwork

Charts

Certifications

See also
 List of Billboard Argentina Hot 100 top-ten singles in 2021

References

2021 singles
2021 songs
Anuel AA songs
Bizarrap songs
Song recordings produced by Bizarrap
Spanish-language songs